Craven Museum & Gallery is a museum located in the town of Skipton, North Yorkshire, England in Skipton Town Hall. The museum holds a collection of local artefacts that depict life in Craven from the prehistoric times to the modern day. In June 2021, the museum reopened after a National Lottery Heritage Funded redevelopment project.

History 
The museum was founded on 6 October 1928 by members of local groups such as the Craven Naturalists and Scientific Association, Skipton Mechanics' Institute, Friends Adult School, and the Workers' Educational Association to house a number of existing collections, including the finds from the Elbolton Cave excavations, the Craven Herbarium, and Richard Tiddeman's reef knoll collection. It was opened by Sir Henry Alexander Miers, president of the museum's association. The museum was located in a room in Skipton library and had its own committee and trustees, with some members being local figureheads such as Mr J. Dufty, a master at the local grammar school.

In 1934, to ensure the survival of the museum and allow its growth, the responsibility of the museum was given to Skipton Urban District Council. The museum continued to gather more objects for its collection and increase in size, and this was the status quo for over 30 years. On 21 April 1969, the Friends of the Craven Museum was established with Dr. Arthur Raistrick as its chair. Within months, it had hundreds of members. The friends were on the constant lookout for anything that could be added to the museum's collection.

Volunteers played a vital part in the museum, especially when it came to transporting heavier objects to the museum such as a Derbyshire ore crusher. The ore crusher was moved over the moors to a van, which took it to the museum where it was restored and unveiled to the public in 1970. Volunteers also did other tasks such as labelling exhibits, carrying out research on the collection, and cleaning displays. The friends also funded excavations; the most notable being a tilery kiln in nearby Rylstone. On 11 December 1973, the museum was officially moved across the road to its current location in Skipton Town Hall.

In 2005 an exhibitions gallery was opened which hosts a variety of temporary exhibitions every year. In 2015 the museum received initial support for a £2.1 million redevelopment project called “Stories and Treasures of street and dale”, which aims to update the museum's facilities.

The museum closed in September 2018 for refurbishment, and it reopened in June 2021.

Collections 

The museum has a variety of objects from prehistoric Craven to the modern day. Objects come from all over the world ranging from Italy to Egypt. Objects range from costumes, photographs, agricultural tools, naturalists collections and an oral history collection.

Biology 
The museum's biology collection consists mainly of the collection of naturalists and enthusiast collectors. Collections include the Colonel Tottie 19th century bird egg collection, the entomology collection, the botany collection, and the zoology collection.

Geology 
The geology collection is made up of a variety of rocks, minerals and fossils, most of which were collected by local collector Welbury Wilkinson Holgate and Dr Arthur Raistrick. Many of the rocks and minerals are from the Craven area, like limestone. Fossils in the collection range from ammonites, coral, bivalves, to the vertebrae of an Ichthyosaurus.

Archaeology 
The archaeology collection ranges from the Paleolithic to post-medieval period. Many items have been found on local excavations. Collections include cave finds from nearby Elbolton and Victoria caves, a lithics collection, finds from Doggerbank, Roman finds from nearby Kirk Sink Villa and from the Sunderland collection, and an Elizabethan coin hoard.

Social History 
The museum has a collection of artefacts associated with social history in Craven. The artefacts cover homelife with a display of domestic appliances, childhood with a collection of toys; working life with exhibits on agriculture, lead mining, and notable people from Craven-such as the Calendar girls, co-founder of Marks and Spencer, Thomas Spencer and Thomas Cresap, who became a pioneer in America.

Oral History 
Over the last four decades, the museum has interviewed local people to find out more about the history of the Craven area. There are 70 tapes overall covering topics such as life during the World Wars, working on the Leeds and Liverpool Canal, and farming.

Art 
The museum has an eclectic collection of oil and watercolour paintings, prints, textiles and sculptures, many made by local artists such as Reginald Arthur Smith, Kenneth Holmes, and William Shuttleworth. The majority of the paintings feature local scenery or people such as Lady Anne Clifford of Skipton Castle. A large portion of the art collection is made up of the famous Roebuck collection belonging to art collector Clement Roebuck.

Costume 
There is a collection of costumes and accessories in the museum, many of which are on permanent display. These include dresses from the 18th century up to contemporary pieces like 1940s evening dresses, uniforms from the Skipton Brass Band and the Home Guard, and accessories include spectacles and ladies' handbags.

Notable collections

First Folio 
An incomplete copy of Shakespeare's First Folio owned by a local businessman and donated by his daughter in the 1930s and was misidentified as a second folio until recently when it was identified by Dr. Anthony James West. The folio is one of only four on display in the world.

The Flasby Sword 
An Iron Age Celtic sword was found on the nearby Flasby moor. By 1880, it was owned by Captain Preston of Flasby Hall. The sword was eventually donated to the museum. The sword is made of iron and the scabbard of copper. It is lined with wood with typical Celtic decorations on it. Because of how well it was preserved, it is believed that the sword was thrown into a pit as a ritual offering.

Merovingian Frankish Gold Tremissis 
The museum holds a tremissis, a Frankish gold coin, that dates from 580 AD to 630AD. It was found in the 1970s when the Holy Trinity Church in Skipton was undergoing construction. A small hole near the edge of the coin suggests it may have been worn as a pendant.

Mouseman Collection 
The museum holds a collection of 17 objects made by the famous carver Robert Thompson, otherwise known as 'Mouseman'. The museum received the collection from the son of Kenneth Hodgson, who was an avid collector of 'Mouseman' furniture.

Roebuck Collection 
145 pieces of art given to the museum by millionaire Clement Roebuck in 1988. Roebuck was an avid art collector and sat on the selection committee for the Huddersfield art gallery and would often acquire pieces rejected by the committee. In his later life, he moved to Starbotton in Upper Wharfedale and then Langbar near Bolton Abbey.

Amethyst Intaglio 
A Roman engraved amethyst intaglio was found in nearby Hellifield and donated to the museum in 1934. The carving presents a man, possibly Odysseus, offering wine to the cyclops Polyphemus before blinding him.

Exhibitions

The gallery, which is located next to the Skipton Tourist Information Centre, puts on a variety of exhibitions. Past exhibitions include the 800th anniversary Magna Carta exhibition, SELFA Champions! exhibit, and Bike, Legs, Action!. This is an exhibition about the Tour De France and its arrival to Yorkshire. The gallery is also home to recurring exhibitions like Craven Open, which displays the work of local artists, and Yarndale, a yearly festival in Skipton about all things Yarn related.

In 2014, the museum temporarily loaned its Shakespeare first folio to the Yorkshire Museum in exchange for two Iron Age gold bracelets dating from around 100 BC. The bracelets are the oldest example of gold found in Yorkshire.

Visitor information

Craven Museum & Gallery is inside the Town Hall which is located on Skipton High Street. It is approximately a five-minute walk from Skipton bus station and a twenty-minute walk from Skipton railway station.

Gallery

References

Museums in North Yorkshire
Musical instrument museums
Skipton